Antología may refer to:

Music

Albums
Antología (V8 album)
Antología (Manuel Mijares album)
Antología (Marcos Witt album)
Antología (Fiskales Ad-Hok album), 2004 
Antologia (Giovanna Marini album), a 2006 album of the Italian singer Giovanna Marini
Antologia, a 4-disc retrospective of the band Shturcite
Antología (Marco Antonio Solís album), 2014

Songs
"Antología" (song), a song by Shakira from the album Pies Descalzos